George Gruntz (24 June 1932 – 10 January 2013) was a Swiss jazz pianist, organist, harpsichordist, keyboardist, and composer known for the George Gruntz Concert Big Band and his work with Phil Woods, Rahsaan Roland Kirk, Don Cherry, Chet Baker, Art Farmer, Dexter Gordon, Johnny Griffin, and Mel Lewis.

Gruntz, who was born in Basel, Switzerland, was also an accomplished arranger and composer, having been commissioned by many orchestras and symphonies. From 1972 to 1994, he served as artistic director of JazzFest Berlin.

He died at the age of 80 in January 2013.

Discography

As leader/co-leader

Main sources:

Compilations
Sins'n Wins'n Funs – Left-cores and Hard-core En-cores, 1981–1990 (Compilation, released 1996)
The MPS Years, 1972–1981 (Compilation, released 1996)
Renaissance Man a.k.a. 30 + 70: The One Hundred Years of George Gruntz, 1961–2000 (Compilation, released 2002)

As sideman
With Franco Ambrosetti
Close Encounter (Enja, 1979)

See also
List of experimental big bands

References

External links
Homepage with biography and extensive discography. Retrieved November 12, 2012 
George Gruntz page at Enja Records site
George Gruntz Phonography at Swiss National Sound Archives

1932 births
2013 deaths
Enja Records artists
Officers Crosses of the Order of Merit of the Federal Republic of Germany
Musicians from Basel-Stadt
Post-bop pianists
Progressive big band musicians
Swiss jazz pianists
20th-century pianists